The Furniture Museum, formerly known as the Norsk Møbelfaglig Senter 'Norwegian Furniture Design Center', is a museum and documentation center for the furniture industry in Norway. The museum is located in Aure in the municipality of Sykkylven, and it is part of the Sunnmøre Museum Foundation. The museum has a permanent display presenting the history of the furniture industry.

See also
Furniture museum

References

External links
 Furniture Museum

Museums in Møre og Romsdal
Sykkylven
Furniture museums